The Forest of Szpęgawsk is situated west of the village of Szpęgawsk in the administrative district of Gmina Starogard Gdański, within Starogard County, Pomeranian Voivodeship, in northern Poland.

Around 5,000-7,000 civilians were killed here between September 1939 and January 1940 during the German occupation of Poland (World War II), mostly by local Germans, members of the Selbstschutz, as part of the wider Intelligenzaktion Pommern. Most of the victims were Polish inhabitants of Pomerania, including many Catholic priests, teachers, school principals, lawyers, doctors, local officials, local activists, merchants, craftsmen, farmers and business people. Some psychiatric hospital patients, Pomeranian Jews and even anti-Nazi Germans were also killed. Among the victims were 1,692 psychiatric hospital patients, including children, from nearby Kocborowo (present-day district of Starogard Gdański), Gniew and Świecie. Also part of the Polish hospital staff was murdered in the forest, while the remaining staff was deported to concentration camps and forced labour in Germany.

39 mass graves have been found.

Gallery

References

See also 

 Mass murders in Piaśnica
 Action T4
 Piaśnica Wielka
 List of Polish Martyrdom sites
 Anti-Polonism

Starogard County
Forests of Poland
Nazi war crimes in Poland